Molly Smolen is an American ballet dancer.

Life and career
Molly Smolen was born in Philadelphia, and trained at the Pennsylvania Academy of Ballet under John White and Margarita de Saa. At 14, she joined American Ballet Theatre and, from 1997 to 1999, she performed as a guest artist with the Estonian National Ballet.

Molly joined Birmingham Royal Ballet as a Soloist in 1999 and was promoted to Principal in 2002. Her performance of Five Brahms Waltzes in the Manner of Isadora Duncan brought her critical acclaim in many countries. She has shone in roles as diverse as the Siren in Prodigal Son and Maggie in Hobson's Choice. She is also a sparkling classical dancer, dancing most of the leading classical roles with the Estonian Ballet before she was 21.

Molly joined San Francisco Ballet as a Principal in 2006-2008.

Repertory: with Estonian National Ballet: principal roles in Giselle, Romeo and Juliet, The Sleeping Beauty and Swan Lake;

Repertory with BRB: works by Frederick Ashton (Five Brahms Waltzes in the Manner of Isadora Duncan, The Two Pigeons  Gypsy Girl, La Fille mal gardée  Lise, Scènes de ballet, Dante Sonata and Voices of Spring); George Balanchine (Concerto barocco - Leading Ballerina, Second Ballerina, Prodigal Son Siren, Western Symphony  First Movement, Apollo  Calliope); David Bintley (Arthur  Morgan, Beauty and the Beast  Belle, Carmina burana  Fortuna, Sylvia Pas de deux, Scottish Dances, The Nutcracker Sweeties  Sugar Rum Cherry, The Shakespeare Suite  Juliet, The Seasons  'Autumn', Hobson's Choice  Maggie Hobson, The Sons of Horus  Isis, Concert Fantasy, Les Petit Riens, Orpheus Suite - Eurydice); John Cranko (Broulliards); Kenneth MacMillan (Romeo and Juliet  Juliet, Elite Syncopations - White Girl); Vaslav Nijinski (Rite of Spring - The Chosen Maiden), and Myrtha, Giselle (Giselle), Sugar Plum Fairy (The Nutcracker), Swanhilda (Coppelia), Odette /Odile (Swan Lake), Aurora (The Sleeping Beauty), Stanton Welch (Powder) and Twyla Tharp In the Upper Room;

Repertory with SFB: works by Helgi Tomasson Clara (The Nutcracker), Kitri (Don Quixote), The Sleeping Beauty, Giselle, On Common Ground ;Val Caniparoli Nora (Ibsen's house); George Balanchine Third Movement (Symphony in C) Molly Smolen retired in 2008.

Awards
She won bronze medal and the Prix de Nina Ricci, for artistic excellence at the Varna International Ballet Competition; bronze medal at the Osaka International Ballet Competition, 1995; Critics' Circle nomination for Newcomer of the Year (2000).

References

External links
 

American ballerinas
Living people
American Ballet Theatre dancers
Artists from Philadelphia
Year of birth missing (living people)
Dancers from Pennsylvania
20th-century American dancers
21st-century American dancers
21st-century American women